They are sessile colonial cnidarians that are found throughout the oceans of the world, especially in the deep sea, polar waters, tropics and subtropics. Whilst not in a strict taxonomic sense, Alcyonacea are commonly known as "soft corals" (Octocorallia) that are quite different from "true" corals (Scleractinia). The term “soft coral” generally applies to organisms in the two orders Pennatulacea and Alcyonaceae with their polyps embedded within a fleshy mass of coenenchymal tissue. Consequently, the term “gorgonian coral” is commonly handled to multiple species in the Alcyonaceae order that produce a mineralized skeletal axis (or axial-like layer) composed of calcite and the proteinaceous material gorgonin only and corresponds to only one of several families within the formally accepted taxon Gorgoniidae (Scleractinia). These can be found in order Malacalcyonacea (taxonomic synonyms of include (unnacepted): Alcyoniina, Holaxonia, Protoalcyonaria, Scleraxonia, and Stolonifera.  They are sessile colonial cnidarians that are found throughout the oceans of the world, especially in the deep sea, polar waters, tropics and subtropics. Common names for subsets of this order are sea fans and sea whips; others are similar to the sea pens of related order Pennatulacea. Individual tiny polyps form colonies that are normally erect, flattened, branching, and reminiscent of a fan. Others may be whiplike, bushy, or even encrusting. A colony can be several feet high and across, but only a few inches thick.  They may be brightly coloured, often purple, red, or yellow. Photosynthetic gorgonians can be successfully kept in captive aquaria.

About 500 different species of gorgonians are found in the oceans of the world, but they are particularly abundant in the shallow waters of the Western Atlantic, including Florida, Bermuda, and the West Indies.

Anatomy

The structure of a gorgonian colony varies. In the suborder Holaxonia, skeletons are formed from a flexible, horny substance called gorgonin. The suborder Scleraxonia species are supported by a skeleton of tightly grouped calcareous spicules. Also, some species encrust like coral. 

Measurements of the gorgonin and calcite within several long-lived species of gorgonians can be useful in paleoclimatology and paleoceanography, as their skeletal growth rate and composition are highly correlated with seasonal and climatic variation.

Features 
Soft corals contain minute, spiny skeletal elements called sclerites, useful in species identification. Sclerites give these corals some degree of support and give their flesh a spiky, grainy texture that deters predators. In the past, soft corals were thought to be unable to lay new foundations for future corals, but recent findings suggest that colonies of the leather-coral genus Sinularia are able to cement sclerites and consolidate them at their base into alcyonarian spiculite, thus making them reef builders.
 
Unlike stony corals, most soft corals thrive in nutrient-rich waters with less intense light. Almost all use symbiotic photosynthetic zooxanthella as a major energy source. However, most readily eat any free-floating food, such as zooplankton, out of the water column. They are integral members of the reef ecosystem and provide habitat for fish, snails, algae, and a diversity of other marine species.

Despite being dominated by "soft corals", the order Alcyonacea now contains all species known as "gorgonian corals", that produce a hard skeleton made from gorgonin, a protein unique to the group that makes their skeletons quite different from "true" corals (Scleractinia). These "gorgonion corals" can be found in suborders Holaxonia, Scleraxonia, and Stolonifera.

Many soft corals are easily collected in the wild for the reef aquarium hobby, as small cuttings are less prone to infection or damage during shipping than stony corals. Nevertheless, home-grown specimens tend to be more adaptable to aquarium life and help conserve wild reefs. Soft corals grow quickly in captivity and are easily divided into new individuals, and so those grown by aquaculture are often hardier and less expensive than imported corals from the wild.

Ecology

Each gorgonian polyp has eight tentacles, which catch plankton and particulate matter for consumption.  This process, called filter feeding, is facilitated when the "fan" is oriented across the prevailing current to maximise water flow to the gorgonian, hence food supply.

Some gorgonians contain algae, or zooxanthellae. This symbiotic relationship assists in giving the gorgonian nutrition by photosynthesis. Gorgonians possessing zooxanthellae are usually characterized by brownish polyps.

Gorgonians are found primarily in shallow waters, though some have been found at depths of several thousand feet. The size, shape, and appearance of gorgonians can be correlated with their location. The more fan-shaped and flexible gorgonians tend to populate shallower areas with strong currents, while the taller, thinner, and stiffer gorgonians can be found in deeper, calmer waters.

Other fauna, such as hydrozoa, bryozoa, and brittle stars, are known to dwell within the branches of gorgonian colonies. The pygmy seahorse not only makes certain species of gorgonians its home, but also closely resembles its host, thus is well camouflaged. Two species of pygmy seahorse, Hippocampus bargibanti and Hippocampus denise, are obligate residents on gorgonians. H. bargibanti is limited to two species in the single genus Muricella.

Gorgonians produce unusual organic compounds in their tissues, particularly diterpenes, and some of these are important candidates for new drugs. These compounds may be part of the chemical defenses produced by gorgonians to render their tissue distasteful to potential predators. Bottlenose dolphins in the Red Sea have been observed swimming against these tissues, in what is thought to be an attempt to take advantage of the antimicrobial qualities of diterpenes. Despite these chemical defenses, the tissues of gorgonians are prey for flamingo tongue snails of the genus Cyphoma, nudibranchs, the fireworm Hermodice spp., and their polyps are food for butterflyfishes. Amongst the nudibranchs which feed on soft corals and sea fans are the Tritoniidae and the genus Phyllodesmium which specialises in eating Xenia species.

Suborders and families
The World Register of Marine Species lists these suborders and families:

 suborder Alcyoniina
 family Acrophytidae McFadden & Ofwegen, 2017
 family Alcyoniidae Lamouroux, 1812
 family Aquaumbridae Breedy, van Ofwegen & Vargas, 2012
 family Corymbophytidae McFadden & Ofwegen, 2017
 family Leptophytidae McFadden & Ofwegen, 2017
 family Nephtheidae Gray, 1862
 family Nidaliidae Gray, 1869
 family Paralcyoniidae Gray, 1869
 family Xeniidae Ehrenberg, 1828
 suborder Calcaxonia
 family Chrysogorgiidae Verrill, 1883
 family Ellisellidae Gray, 1859
 family Ifalukellidae Bayer, 1955
 family Isididae Lamouroux, 1812
 family Primnoidae Milne Edwards, 1857
 suborder Holaxonia
 family Acanthogorgiidae Gray, 1859
 family Dendrobrachiidae Brook, 1889
 family Gorgoniidae Lamouroux, 1812
 family Keroeididae Kinoshita, 1910
 family Plexauridae Gray, 1859
 suborder Protoalcyonaria
 family Taiaroidae Bayer & Muzik, 1976
 suborder Scleraxonia
 family Anthothelidae Broch, 1916
 family Briareidae Gray, 1859
 family Coralliidae Lamouroux, 1812
 family Melithaeidae Gray, 1870
 family Paragorgiidae Kükenthal, 1916
 family Parisididae Aurivillius, 1931
 family Spongiodermidae Wright & Studer, 1889
 family Subergorgiidae Gray, 1859
 family Victorgorgiidae Moore, Alderslade & Miller, 2017
 suborder Stolonifera
 family Acrossotidae Bourne, 1914
 family Arulidae McFadden & van Ofwegen, 2012
 family Clavulariidae Hickson, 1894
 family Coelogorgiidae Bourne, 1900
 family Cornulariidae Dana, 1846
 family Pseudogorgiidae Utinomi & Harada, 1973
 family Tubiporidae Ehrenberg, 1828
 family Acanthoaxiidae van Ofwegen & McFadden, 2010
 family Haimeidae Wright, 1865
 family Paramuriceidae Bayer, 1956
 family Parasphaerascleridae McFadden & van Ofwegen, 2013
 family Viguieriotidae

References

External links

 The Marine Fauna Gallery of Norway
 AnimalDiversity
 Gorgonian Corals

 
Octocorallia
Cnidarian orders